The University of Sciences and Arts of Latin America (UCAL) is a private university that was founded on February 17, 2010 by the Peruvian magister and economist Luis Deza. Currently it is located in La Molina District and has 10 professional careers in 4 faculties. It is the first university in which it specializes enough in Architecture and Graphic Design Advertising, also known as the University of Creativity of Peru.

History
In 2010, Luis Carpio Ascuña, president of the National Council for the Authorization of Universities (CONAFU), delivered the Peruvian economist Mg. Luis Deza, who was the promoter of Promotora de Servicios y Productos Educativos (PRODSE). On February 17 of the same year, 1 was approved the foundation of the University of Sciences and Arts of Latin America.

Careers and Faculties

Faculty of Architecture
 Architecture
 Interior architecture

Faculty of Communication
 Audiovisual Communication and Cinema
 Communication and Advertising Transmedia
 Communication and Corporate Image
 Communication and Journalism
 Communications

Faculty of Design
 Advertising Graphic Design
 Strategic Graphic Design

Faculty of Business and Innovation
 Marketing and Innovation

References

Educational institutions established in 2010
Universities in Lima
2010 establishments in Peru